The M551 "Sheridan" AR/AAV (Armored Reconnaissance/Airborne Assault Vehicle) was a light tank developed by the United States and named after General Philip Sheridan, of American Civil War fame. It was designed to be landed by parachute and to swim across rivers. It was armed with the technically advanced but troublesome M81/M81 Modified/M81E1 152 mm gun/launcher, which fired both conventional ammunition and the MGM-51 Shillelagh guided anti-tank missile.

The M551 Sheridan entered service with the United States Army in 1967. At the urging of General Creighton Abrams, the U.S. Commander, Military Assistance Command Vietnam, at the time, the M551 was rushed into combat service to South Vietnam in January 1969. Later that year, M551s were deployed to units in Europe and South Korea. The Sheridan saw extensive combat in the Vietnam War, where problems with the platform became evident, particularly its poor survivability and reliability.

Based on its experiences in Vietnam, the Army realized the shortcomings of the Sheridan, and after the war in 1975 began to eliminate the vehicle from its units in 1979. A modest fleet of vehicles remained in the 82nd Airborne Division and the National Guard. Various improvement programs were successfully undertaken to improve the Sheridan's reliability. Problems persisted with the 152 mm gun/launcher, and various efforts explored to replace it with a more conventional model. The Sheridan went on to serve in the invasion of Panama and the Gulf War. The Army sought to replace the Sheridan with the M8 Armored Gun System, but this was canceled in 1996, late in its development. The Sheridan was retired without a designated replacement in 1996. The Army acquired the M1128 Mobile Gun System to fulfill a similar requirement, but this is being retired in 2022. The Army current light tank acquisition program is Mobile Protected Firepower.

A large bulk of Sheridans were retained in service at the National Training Center (NTC) at Fort Irwin, California and as Armor Officer Basic training at Armor Training Center, then located at Fort Knox, Kentucky. They worked as simulated Soviet armored opposition force (OPFOR) to train U.S. military units on simulated tank on tank armored combat to test on combat effectiveness in a desert environment. They were finally retired from the NTC in 2003.

Development

In the immediate post-World War II era, the U.S. Army introduced the M41 Walker Bulldog into service to fill the role of a light tank. The lifespan of the M41 was fairly short; at 25 tons it was considered too heavy to be a true light tank, and had a rather short cruising range. Plans were started to build an even lighter replacement mounting the same gun, the T71 and T92. The T92 appeared to be the more promising of the two. However, as the prototypes were entering testing, information about the new Soviet PT-76 light tank became available. The PT-76 was amphibious, and soon there were demands that any U.S. light tank should be able to swim as well. The T92 could not be easily refitted for this role, so the Army canceled the program in 1958.

In January 1959, the first concept studies were initiated for the armored reconnaissance/airborne assault vehicle that would replace both the M41 and M56 Scorpion self-propelled gun. By October 1959, 12 proposals had been received by the Ordnance Tank Automotive Command. Two proposals were downselected in December: One from Cadillac Motor Car Division of General Motors Corporation, and a joint venture of AAI Corporation and Allis-Chalmers Manufacturing Company. Mockups of both proposals were evaluated in May 1960.

The AAI candidate had three crewmen, and weighed the closest to the 10-ton weight limit specified in the requirements. The Cadillac design was only slightly heavier, with four crew. The three-man turret of the Cadillac proposal was considered more effective than the two-man turret proposed by AAI. The weight limit was reset at 15 tons. In June 1960, Cadillac Motor Car Division signed a contract to develop their concept further, which was designated as the AR/AAV XM551. In August 1961, the Secretary of the Army approved the name "Sheridan," after Major General Philip Sheridan.

A test bed underwent operations at Cleveland Tank Plant in December 1961. The decision to use the 152 mm caliber XM81 gun-launcher instead of a more conventional gun was driven by the desire to save weight. The XM81 weighed about half as much as the 105 mm caliber M68, and could fire both conventional and missile rounds. Testing of the XM81 began at Erie Army Depot in late 1961.

By 1962, the Army realized that the MGM-51 Shillelagh missile system would not immediately be ready for the Sheridan, and so considered several alternative gun systems. These including conventional 76 mm, 90 mm and 105 mm options, as well as missile systems such as ENTAC and TOW. The Army ultimately decided to arm the Sheridan with just 152 mm conventional rounds until the Shillelagh was ready.

The first of 12 pilots was delivered in June 1962. Pilots 1–3 comprised the first generation. With the second generation pilots 4–6, the band track was replaced with single-pin, link type tracks. An XM551 test bed turret with gun-launcher was mated to an M41 chassis, which began firing tests in August 1962 at Aberdeen Proving Ground. The third generation of pilots, starting with pilot 7, eliminated the water jet propulsion. Pilots 9–11 were delivered in 1964, and pilot 12 was delivered in February 1965.

In the 1960s the Army was also developing the MBT-70 main battle tank with West Germany. The U.S. Army no longer used the heavy, medium, and light tank classifications. In 1960, with the deactivation of its last (M103) heavy tank battalion, and the fielding of the new M60 series tank, the U.S. Army had adopted a main battle tank (MBT) doctrine; a single tank filling all combat roles. The U.S. Army still retained the M41 Walker Bulldog light tank in the Army National Guard, but other than the units undergoing the transitional process, the regular army consisted of MBTs. Fearing Congress would balk at funding two developmental tank programs, the Army chose to designate the Sheridan as an armored reconnaissance vehicle rather than a light tank.  The Army also believed "tank" too much evoked the main battle tank, a different role altogether, so the new project was instead officially classified as an "Armored Reconnaissance/Airborne Assault Vehicle."

Production
In April 1965 the Army awarded a four-year $114.5 million contract to the Cadillac Gage division of the General Motors (GM) for the production of the M109 howitzer and the XM551 General Sheridan. Limited production was approved in May, and then classified as "Standard A" in May 1966. Production took place at Cleveland Army Tank Automotive Plant. The first two production units were delivered to the Army in July. During development, the Marine Corps evaluated the Sheridan as a possible replacement for the M50 Ontos. The Corps determined that the Sheridan would be too costly.

The Sheridan entered service in June 1967 with 1st Battalion, 63rd Armor Regiment at Fort Riley. 2,426 Sheridans were planned. In the end, 1,662 Sheridans were built between 1966 and November 1970. Total cost of the M551 program was $1.3 billion. The M81 gun had problems with cracks developing near the breech after repeated firing, a problem that was later tracked to the "key" on the missiles that ran in a slot cut into the barrel. Most field units were modified to help address the problem, but later the modified M81E1 was introduced with a shallower slot, along with a matching modification to the missile, that cured the problem. The gun also has been criticized for having too much recoil for the vehicle weight, the second and even third road wheels coming clear off the ground when the main gun fired. In March 1967, a 105 mm howitzer XM103E7 and then a 76 mm gun was installed in the turret of an M551 at Rock Island Arsenal. Neither configuration was adopted.

In January 1969 two squadrons (54 Sheridans) were deployed to the Republic of South Vietnam and assigned to the 3rd Squadron, 4th Cavalry and one squadron of the 11th Armored Cavalry Regiment for combat testing. In March 1969, after the Army invoked secrecy in declining to disclose program costs, a Government Accounting Office (GAO) official said that development costs had reached $1.3 billion. Congressman Samuel S. Stratton criticized Army officials for the program's high costs, and accused officials of concealing cost figures to cover up for their own "bumbling ineptness." A GAO report leaked in May revealed the Army had fast-tracked the program to avoid budgetary scrutiny, despite indications by May 1966 that the tank's caseless ammunition was prone to cooking off. The problem had since then been resolved by a compressed-air system that forced hot ammunition residue from the breech, the Army told Congress. The Army said the Sheridan had performed well enough that it was planning to send hundreds more. A Congressional report in July identified $1.2 billion wasted on the M60 and Sheridan. The report attributed several Vietnam War casualties to Sheridan design faults, and said that the tank had been wholly unready for combat there "without extensive and costly retrofits."

The vehicle designed to mount the gun had a steel turret and aluminum hull. Although the hull could deflect heavy machine gun fire of up to 12.7 mm AP, it was easily penetrated by rocket-propelled grenades (RPGs), which could destroy the vehicle if the spalling contacted the caseless main gun rounds. Like the M113 armored personnel carrier, it was also vulnerable to mines.

Swimming capability was provided by a flotation screen, similar to that used by the World War II, amphibious DD Tanks. The front armor was overlain by a wooden "surfboard", actually three folded layers, hinged together. This could be opened up into a sloping vertical surface in front of the driver providing a bow of a boat hull, about level with the top of the turret. Fabric formed the rest of the water barrier, folding up from compartments lining the upper corner where the side met the top of the hull, and held up at the back with poles. The front of the "hull" was provided with a plastic window, but in practice it was found that water splashing onto it made it almost useless, and the driver instead usually had to take steering directions from the vehicle commander. The M2 Bradley adopted a similar solution, but dropped it with upgraded armor.

In the Vietnam War, firing the gun often adversely affected the delicate electronics, which were at the early stages of the transition to solid state devices, so the missile and its guidance system was omitted from vehicles deployed to South Vietnam. The expensive missile was fired in anger only in the Persian Gulf War's Operation Desert Storm, despite a production run of 88,000 units.

In 1971, Frankford Arsenal awarded Hughes Aircraft Corporation a contract to begin producing the AN/VVG-1 laser rangefinder for the M551A1 upgrade.

Service history

Vietnam War

The U.S. Army staff in Washington had been recommending since 1966 to the commander of U.S. forces in South Vietnam, General Westmoreland, that the Sheridan should be used there. However, since the main gun ammunition was not available, he argued that it was simply a $300,000 machine gun platform. By 1968, the new, or soon to be, U.S. commander in South Vietnam, General Creighton Abrams, had been notified that the 152 mm shells were now available for the Sheridan. However, as General Abrams began to make preparations for the equipping of U.S. cavalry squadrons for the vehicle, the affected squadrons expressed their concerns that the new aluminum tanks were not only highly vulnerable to mines and anti-tank rocket fire, but they would not be as capable of "jungle busting" as the M48A3 medium tanks.

In late 1968, General Abrams met with Colonel George S. Patton IV - the son of World War II General Patton - commander of the 11th Armored Cavalry Regiment (11th ACR), the only full regiment of cavalry in South Vietnam. When Abrams mentioned the cavalry's concerns over the new vehicle, Patton recommended that the Sheridans be combat tested by a divisional cavalry squadron as well as a squadron from his own regiment; as the squadrons had completely different missions.

First deployment

The first Sheridans to arrive in South Vietnam did so in January 1969 and were accompanied by their factory representatives, instructors and evaluators as the new vehicles were issued to the 3rd Squadron, 4th Cavalry Regiment, and the 1st Squadron of the 11th ACR. By the end of 1970, there were more than 200 Sheridans in South Vietnam, and they stayed in the field until the last U.S. armored cavalry unit, the 1st Squadron, 1st Cavalry Regiment prepared for re-deployment back to the United States in April 1972. By the end of its combat debut in 1972, the Sheridan had seen extensive action in the Vietnam War, being assigned to nearly all armored cavalry squadrons involved in that conflict. In 1969, armored cavalry units (minus the 11th ACR, which retained its M48 tank companies) began replacing their M48 Patton tanks, which in turn were normally transferred to the Army of South Vietnam. The opinions of crews on Vietnam-era M551s were mixed at best and assessments from senior commanders were often negative. This was due largely to the high loss rate of Sheridans and casualty rates among crews; landmines and RPGs that would damage an M48 Patton tank, tended to destroy a Sheridan and either kill or wound most of its crew.

A 1969 evaluation of the vehicles found that the M551 was employed in reconnaissance, night patrol and road clearing, accumulating 39,455 road miles and 520 combat missions, with a ready rate of 81.3 percent. Despite vulnerability to rockets and mines, it was judged worthy of applying modifications and equipping all cavalry squadrons with the Sheridan.

First combat/first losses
In addition to the problems presented by aluminum construction, the Sheridan had a defect that no other common armored vehicle possessed: it fired caseless 152 mm main gun rounds. These rounds were "fixed", meaning that, unlike the artillery, the warhead was factory attached to the propellant, and if the warhead separated from the propellant during loading, which was not uncommon, the crewmen were instructed not to load the round. Sometimes, these unspent propellant charges remained on the turret floor due to the emergencies at the time, and in either case, all of the remaining serviceable 152 mm shells still remained caseless, albeit attached to their warheads, and sleeved into a re-usable white nine-ply nylon bag, which was form-fitted to hold the propellant portion of the shell. The white/silver-colored bag had a strap attached to the bottom, which the loader would grab and pull off prior to gently inserting the shell into the breech. Once a mine or RPG-type weapon created the spark, smoke and fire became imminent, and it became a matter of Standing Operating Procedure to abandon the tank immediately. On 15 February 1969, just one month after the Sheridan's arrival in South Vietnam, an M551 from the 3/4th Cavalry detonated a 25-pound pressure-triggered land mine, which ruptured its hull and ignited the 152 mm shells, resulting in a secondary explosion that destroyed the tank. In late 1969, nine Sheridans from the 4th Squadron, 12th Cavalry Regiment were fording a river near the DMZ, when three of the M551s detonated mines, completely destroying them. In March 1971, five Sheridans from the 11th ACR were lost in one day to RPG fire; all five vehicles burst into flames and were totally destroyed. It became a common scene to observe melted Sheridan hulls with their sunken steel turrets sitting at odd angles with their gun tubes pointing towards the sky in various parts of the country, either awaiting final disposition, or simply forgotten.

Performance

The Sheridan had several advantages: it did not get stuck in the mud as often as the 52-ton M48 did, nor did it throw its track off as often. This alone was enough to win the tank crews' favor. The light weight and high mobility proved their worth, and the gun proved an effective anti-personnel weapon when used with either the M657 HE shell or the M625 canister round, which used thousands of flechettes as projectiles.

The reliability of the engine system and gun of the tank was, however, not fully up to the task. Of 74 M551 sent to Vietnam in February 1969, by May there were recorded 16 serious mechanical faults, 41 failed shots, 140 defective ammunitions and 25 burned engines; the turret itself had 125 electric faults, several recoil system faults and instances of blown up guns. An additional problem was that much of the carried machine-gun ammunition had to be stored outside the turret as the internal space was extremely limited.

Although an average M48 crew could fire as many as seventeen 90 mm shells during a "mad minute" (60 seconds with all guns firing-on command), the Sheridan was known to put out only two 152 mm shells during the same time frame. While the M48's 90 mm cannon fired fixed metallic cased rounds, the 152 mm was caseless. The caseless rounds needed air vents to clear the gun tube and breech prior to loading another round, while the M48 breech block opened as the used shell was ejected and closed as the new shell was shoved in. The faster the loader, the faster the Patton's gun could be fired. For the Sheridan, the loader had to wait for the mechanism. After firing, the loader would have to wait, as the breech slowly opened rearward then turned downward. After another instrument indicated that all turret systems were still operational, the loader would gently push the 152 mm fixed round into the breech and watch the breech block slowly rotate upward, then forward into the breech, then again, wait for the lights.

Over 200 Sheridans were shipped to Vietnam. The Sheridan was much appreciated by the infantry, who were desperate for direct-fire support, and generally served in armored cavalry units along with ACAVs (M113s). Armor units consisted solely of tanks (minus headquarters company) and mechanized infantry units consisted solely of M113s. In this role, the real problem with the Sheridan was its limited ammunition load; normally, only 20 rounds and 8 missiles; although, as the M551s in Vietnam service were not equipped with missiles or their guidance equipment, this increased the basic load of conventional rounds. Sheridan losses were heavy during normal operations, largely due to land mines and anti-armor weapons, but were especially heavy after the start of the Cambodian Campaign in May 1970 in which, among other cavalry squadrons, the 11th ACR was thrown into the fight. The second heaviest losses were during the U.S. Army's final offensive of the war, operation Dewey Canyon II, when the Cavalry's remaining Sheridan squadrons met near disaster on the Laos border during the early months of 1971, in particular the 1/1st Cavalry.

Combat field modifications
A common field-modification was to mount a large steel shield, known as an "ACAV set" (Armored Cavalry Assault Vehicle), around the commander's 50-cal. (12.7 mm) gun, allowing it to be fired with some level of protection. The driver has an unusual rotating hatch which has vision blocks when rotated forward. Included with the set was an extra layer of steel belly armor which was bolted onto the vehicle's bottom, although only covering from the front to half way to the end, possibly due to weight reasons.

A standard modification made during the mid-70s was the addition of the "Cereal Bowl" commander's cupola. This mod came about due to the "broken rib" effect that occurred when the Sheridan fired conventional rounds; the recoil would pitch the commander against the armor plating, resulting in cracked ribs.

Post–Vietnam War service
The Army began to phase out the Sheridan in 1978, although at the time there was no real replacement. Nevertheless, the 82d Airborne Division was able to keep them until 1996. The Sheridan was the only "rapidly" air-deployable tank in the inventory. Their units were later upgraded to the M551A1 TTS model, including a thermal sighting system for the commander and gunner.

In the early 1980s, the M551A1 was fitted with a visual modification kit to resemble Warsaw Pact vehicles from Soviet BMP-1, ZSU-23, T-55 to T-80s, at the National Training Center at Fort Irwin, California. These modified vehicles were used in part of the U.S. Army's Soviet opposition forces (OPFOR) by providing realistic ground training to U.S. military units about Soviet combat doctrine in a desert environment.  The OPFOR Sheridans no longer fulfill that role, having been retired at the end of 2003 and subsequently scrapped or made available as "hard targets" or, in a few cases, as museum pieces. Many were dumped to create artificial reefs.

Panama

The Sheridan's only air drop in combat occurred during the United States invasion of Panama (Operation Just Cause) in 1989, when 14 M551s were deployed with C Company, 3/73rd Armor, 82nd Airborne Division. Four M551s were secretly delivered to Howard Air Force Base in Panama aboard a C-5 Galaxy in December 1989, days before the invasion. They were attached to TF Bayonet (193rd Infantry Brigade), and attached down further to TF Gator. These Sheridans took part in the attack on the Comandancia, initially supported by fire from Quarry Heights, and later displacing forward into the city. As part of Team Armor, these Sheridans later provided support to JSOC elements as they secured high-value targets throughout Panama City. The remaining 10 Sheridans were delivered via C-141 low-velocity airdrop (LVAD) to Torrijos-Tocumen Airport some hours after H-hour. One of these was destroyed after its parachutes failed to deploy, while another was damaged. As of 2009, this marked the first and only combat air-drop of tanks in history.

The Sheridan was praised for its performance in Panama. A U.S. after-action report noted the Sheridan's "extreme psychological effect on enemy forces", who were apparently deterred from firing at U.S. forces reinforced by tanks.

Gulf War
In the early days of Desert Shield, Sheridans were airlanded in Saudi Arabia before coalition heavy armor arrived by ship. The first Sheridans sent were the M551A1 model. The Army hastily sent 60 M551A1 TTS models with the thermal sight upgrade to replace the older models. The 3/73rd used the Sheridan as part of a flanking force in Operation Desert Storm, and saw tank-on-tank combat. Their role was limited to reconnaissance due to their age and light armor. It is likely that no more than six Shillelagh missiles were fired at Iraqi anti-tank guns or T-55s; this was the only occasion in which Shillelagh missiles were fired in anger, from the inventory of 88,000 missiles produced. Other than some overheating problems in the summer months of the buildup, the Sheridan suffered no mechanical breakdowns in combat and performed extremely well.

Australian trials
During 1967 and 1968 the Australian Army trialled two Sheridans to determine if the type met a requirement for light armored fighting vehicles to serve with the Royal Australian Armoured Corps newly formed cavalry regiments. The main trials took place in the tropical Innisfail area of north Queensland between January and June 1968. In January 1969 the Minister for the Army announced that Australia would not purchase any Sheridans as the tanks did not meet the Army's requirements. The main shortcoming revealed in the trials concerned the safety of the combustible case. The two Sheridans were returned to the U.S. Army in early 1969, and the Australian Army met its requirement by fitting turrets from Alvis Saladin armoured cars to M113 armored personnel carriers.

Replacement 

In 1977, TRADOC commander General Donn A. Starry met with Army Chief of Staff General Edward C. Meyer to convince him that the service should retire the Sheridan. Starry had commanded the 11th ACR in Vietnam, and knew the vehicle's shortcomings. Starry's arguments prevailed over those of Army Material Command commander General John R. Guthrie, a Sheridan defender, and Meyer agreed the Sheridan would be retired. The Army decided on the M60A1 as the service's interim successor until the M3 Bradley was ready. At the time, 567 Sheridans existed in USAREUR, 535 in the continental U.S., and 41 in the Pacific. The Army began converting units in Europe in 1978, and in the rest of the service by 1980. The Army sustained 140 Sheridans in the 82nd Airborne Division and the National Guard. Some Sheridans were kept in pre-positioned reserve.

Several attempts to improve or replace the Sheridan have been made over the years since it was introduced. In 1976, DARPA (followed by TACOM) initiated the High Mobility/Agility (HIMAG) program. Several concepts were pursued, including the High Survivability Test Vehicle – Light and the Elevated Kinetic Energy gun system. The latter was trialled on a Sheridan hull in 1982. Following the Iran hostage crisis, the Rapid Deployment Force concept was pursued by both the Army and the Marine Corps. The Marine Corps initiated the Mobile Protected Weapon System (MPWS) program. In 1983, the Naval Surface Weapons Research Center Laboratory mounted a 105 mm caliber gun onto a Sheridan chassis. The Army initiated the Mobile Protected Gun program, and announced plans to modify Sheridans with 105 mm or 120 mm caliber guns. Neither program was pursued further; The Army project was canceled in 1985.

From 1978 to 1980, under the joint Army–Marine Corps Advanced Antiarmor Vehicle Evaluation (ARMVAL), TACOM rebuilt 10 Sheridans with the General Motors 8V53T diesel engine and improved suspension. The vehicle's armament and some armor was removed. The uprated engine and improved suspension improved the power-to-weight ratio and cross-country mobility. The Army also evaluated a fully stabilized Staget sighting system.

In 1987, the Army tested a version of the LAV-25, classified as the M1047. The Army determined that these were unsuitable for LAPES, and could not match the firepower of the Sheridan. Congress did not favor the M1047, though a few were deployed with the 3/73rd Armor in the Gulf War. The Marine Corps also developed the LAV-105 to meet its requirements, but later canceled that project as well. In 1992, the Army selected FMC Corporation to produce the Armored Gun System (AGS), later type classified as the M8 Armored Gun System. The AGS was canceled in 1996 by the Pentagon before it could enter production. United Defense proposed the AGS as its mobile gun system variant in the Interim Armored Vehicle program. In 2000, the Army instead selected a variant of the General Dynamics' LAV III, later type-classified as the M1128 Mobile Gun System. The Mobile Gun System's problematic service history led to the vehicle's planned retirement in 2022. The Army has initiated development of a light tank acquisition program called Mobile Protected Firepower.

Design

Armament

Building a vehicle lighter than the T92 required an innovative solution for the main armament. A gun firing kinetic energy penetrators to defeat modern tanks at reasonable range was too large for the XM551; gun weight was typically dependent on caliber and muzzle velocity. This was solved by arming the XM551 with a 152 mm M81 gun firing low velocity M409 HEAT rounds. The large caliber ensured it would produce a powerful shaped charge effect capable of penetrating tank armor, since velocity has no effect on shaped charge penetration, while the short gun would reduce overall weight.

The gun was ideal for infantry support. The large, low velocity gun could fire a large explosive shell or canister shot. In comparison, high-velocity anti-tank guns over-penetrated soft targets, while smaller caliber weapons could not carry as great a payload.

The M81E1 was not ideal in medium- and long-range tank engagements as its low velocity produced extended flight times, and made it difficult to lead moving targets. Therefore, the gun was also designed to fire MGM-51 Shillelagh anti-tank missiles. The low launch velocity against longer-ranged targets was not an issue for the missile. However, the MGM-51 was considered a risky project.

A number of existing vehicles already mounted only ATGMs, or alternately recoilless rifles like the M50 Ontos, but these typically had limited utility in the infantry support role, or in the case of Ontos could not be reloaded from within the vehicle. The XM551 appeared to offer a superior balance between anti-tank and infantry support.

Mobility

Tactical mobility

The Sheridan was powered by a large 300-hp (224 kW) Detroit Diesel 6V53T diesel engine, and a flat track (no support rollers). The XM551 thus had an excellent power-to-weight ratio and mobility, able to run at speeds up to 72 km/h (45 mph). However, the vehicle proved to be very noisy and unreliable under combat conditions.

The Sheridan could swim across a river that was about 46 m (50 yards) wide. Tanks in the Patton series (M46, M47, M48), as well as the M60 tank could not perform these operations; they would have to crawl along the river bottoms using snorkels. Not by design, it was found that the swimming hardware acted to reduce the effectiveness of RPG hits, but it was rarely used in Vietnam.

Strategic mobility

The Sheridan can be rigged for low-velocity airdrop from C-130 (19,000 kg, 42,000 lb max load), C-141 aircraft (17,460 kg, 38,500 lb max load), and the C-5. Many films exist showing the Sheridan being pulled out of a C-130 Hercules transport by brake chutes and skidding to a stop. The Low Altitude Parachute Extraction System (LAPES) is a somewhat risky maneuver that allows accurate delivery onto a field when landing is not possible, and the practice was stopped in the late 1990s. The tank is strapped down to a special pallet which absorbs most of the landing impact. The crew does not ride in the tank during extraction, but parachutes from another plane. On landing, they go to their tank, release the lines, and drive it away.

Variants
 XM551/M551 - The M551 was the basic production model, beginning production in 1967. The XM551 had been a limited run pre-production model produced in 1965.
 "Two Box" M551 - With the obvious shortcomings of the Shillelagh missile, all but two of the guidance and fire control components of the missile system were removed (the power supply and rate sensor were retained. These were needed for stabilized turret operation.). The resulting additional space was filled with two separate boxes, one for 7.62×51mm NATO ammunition (coaxial machine gun), and one for 12.7×99mm NATO (.50 BMG) ammunition, and the missile stowage was redesigned to accept conventional rounds.
 M551A1 - Upgraded M551 with AN/VVG-1 laser rangefinder.
 M551A1 TTS - Tank Thermal Sight, fitted with the AN/VSG-2B thermal sight unit, similar to the unit used on the M60A3 MBT. This later became standard to all M551A1s.
 M551 NTC - National Training Center. Using M551 hulls, the NTC created a number of mock vehicles for training exercises resembling common Soviet/Warsaw pact types. They were also known as 'vismods', short for VISually MODified. They have since been retired in favor of similarly converted M113s and M1 Abrams.
 Armored Tracked Recovery Vehicle (ATRV) - Prototype.

Table of variants

Display vehicles

 Camp Joseph T. Robinson, Arkansas National Guard Museum
 Carolinas Aviation Museum
 Fort Benning, static display on Tower Branch of U.S. Army Airborne School across from Maneuver Center of Excellence.
 First Division Museum at Cantigny, an example of the M551A1 is on display in the tank park outside the First Division Museum at Cantigny in Wheaton, Illinois
 Antioch, Illinois has a veterans monument displaying a M551A1 across the street from the police station. 
 Fort Irwin/NTC, has one vehicle on display at the 11th Cavalry Regiment museum.
 Fort Polk, a "T-72" VISMOD is on display on Mississippi Avenue near the headquarters of 1st Battalion, 509th Parachute Infantry Regiment.
 Fort Richardson, Camp Denali on static display
 The Museum of American Armor, Old Bethpage, NY on static display.
 Gowen Field, Idaho Army National Guard
 Hardwood Range, an example is on static display at the visitor center at Hardwood Air-to-Ground Weapons Range in Finley, Wisconsin.
 The Ontario Regiment Museum, in Oshawa, has two Sheridan tanks on display. One is in not operating condition and the other has been restored with its original 11th Cavalry markings.
 Camp Perry, near Port Clinton, Ohio, has an M551 on display as part of a static display.
Airborne & Special Operations Museum, Fayetetteville, NC
 The American Armoured Foundation's Tank and Ordnance War Memorial Museum, Danville, VA. M551A1 deployed in Desert Shield/Storm. Markings: 3rd Battalion 73 Regiment, Co. B, 2nd platoon, attached to the 82nd Airborne Division.
 Fort Hunter Liggett on static display at the entrance.
 The American Heritage Museum, Stow, Massachusetts has an M551 that is in operating condition.
 American Society of Military History and Museums, South El Monte, Ca. 2 non running exhibits and a running, ex-vismod unit.
 Fort Knox, Kentucky. Static display at Wilson Road entrance
 Ike Skelton Missouri National Guard Training Facility, Jefferson City Missouri Ike Skelton Training Facility has a M551 in their outside museum
 Fort Bliss, static display at Sheridan Gate entrance.
 Yad La-Shiryon Israel
Camp Beauregard in Pineville, LA static display outside of the post museum.
 Museum of Missouri Military History, on static display outside the museum
 Watervliet Arsenal
 Yuma Proving Ground in Yuma, AZ. On static display outside range control.
Mott's Military Museum in Groveport, Ohio has an M551 on display outside with other various vehicles.
Vietnam Veterans of America, in Baltimore, MD has an M551A1 on display outside of the building at 6401 Beckley St.
 Fort Bragg, NC  Outdoor exhibit at the 82d Airborne Division War Memorial Museum

See also

 List of "M" series military vehicles
 List of vehicles of the U.S. Armed Forces
 M60A2, which used a similar 152 mm gun-launcher
 M3 Bradley, a modern AFV that sometimes covers the same roles

References
Notes

Bibliography

 
Hunnicutt, R.P. Abrams, A History of the American Main Battle Tank. Vol. 2. Presidio Press 1990.

External links

 Vietnam-Germany-Fort Irwin: the Eaglehorse and the M551 Sheridan - an in-depth history of the M551 Sheridan
 M551 at AFV Database
 M551A1 at Global Security
 Tanques y Blindados: Historia del carro de combate
 XM551, M551 & M551A1 Photos
 The Sheridan

Cold War tanks of the United States
Reconnaissance vehicles
Amphibious tanks
Airborne tanks
Light tanks of the Cold War
Light tanks of the United States
Military vehicles introduced in the 1960s